Chop is a 2011 American horror comedy film directed by Trent Haaga, starring Will Keenan and Timothy Muskatell. The film was Haaga's directorial debut.

Cast
 Will Keenan as Lance Reed
 Timothy Muskatel as The Stranger
 Chad Ferrin as Bobby Reed
 Tanishaa Mukerji as Emily Reed
 Adam Minarovich as Detective Williams
 Jeffrey Sisson as Jeff the Freak
 Camille Keaton as Mrs. Reed

Release
The movie was released on DVD, Video on demand, Microsoft Movies & TV, Amazon Prime Video, PlayStation Video and iTunes Store on 27 December 2011.

Reception
Joel Harley of Starburst rated the film 5 stars out of 5, criticising the first half an hour of the film, while writing that the film is "fitfully amusing and admirably zany, most notably during its first major chop sequence". Howard Gorman of Scream rated the film 4 stars out of 4. Corey Danna of HorrorNews.net rated the film 5 stars out of 5, writing, "With a terrific cast and script, “Chop” manages to be a hell of a fun film, one that is unpredictable, hilarious, and fun." 

Scott Hallam of Dread Central rated the film 4 stars out of 5, praising the acting, the humour, the F/X, and the film's uniqueness. Dave Canfield of ScreenAnarchy wrote a positive review of the film, writing, "Once again Bloody Disgusting Selects has found a genuine minor gem to join the ranks of the increasingly must see series of titles on their label."

References

External links
 
 

2011 horror films
2010s English-language films
American comedy horror films
2011 comedy horror films